The Pulletop bushfire, officially referred to as the Wandoo fire, started on the 6 February 2006 in hot dry and windy weather conditions approximately  southeast of Wagga Wagga in the Australian state of New South Wales. The fire was thought to have been started by sparks from a tractor on a property at Pulletop which quickly got out of control. The New South Wales Rural Fire Service declared a bushfire emergency and the Hume Highway was closed late in the afternoon with fears that the fire would threaten the towns of Humula, Book Book, Livingstone and Kyeamba after  of farmland was burnt.  By 7 February 2006 milder conditions helped firefighters to control the fire burning in inaccessible country.

Overview
Over  of farmland was burnt and the following damage reported:
 2,500 sheep killed
 6 cattle killed
 3 vehicles destroyed
 2 hay sheds destroyed
  of fencing burnt
 Pine plantations worth 5 million were destroyed, including a communications installation
 A natural disaster was declared

Gallery

See also

Bushfires in Australia

References

External links

 NSW RFS Pulletop fire photos

History of New South Wales
2006 in Australia
2006
History of Wagga Wagga
2006 wildfires
2000s in New South Wales